Nemanja Šarović (born 28 December 1974) is a politician in Serbia. He served several terms in the National Assembly of Serbia as a member of the far-right Serbian Radical Party (Srpska radikalna stranka, SRS) before resigning from the party in July 2020. He is now the leader of the Love, Faith, Hope (Ljubav, vera, nada, LJVN) political movement.

Early life and career
Šarović was born in Belgrade, in what was then the Socialist Republic of Serbia in the Socialist Federal Republic of Yugoslavia. He graduated from the University of Belgrade Faculty of Law, apprenticed in law, and worked for two and a half years in Belgrade's first municipal court before entering politics.

Politician

Early years (2000–04)
Šarović was a SRS candidate in the 2000 Yugoslavian parliamentary election, appearing in the lead position on the party's electoral list for the Chamber of Citizens in the Belgrade division of Palilula. The party did not win any seats in the division. He also ran for both the City Assembly of Belgrade and the Stari Grad municipal assembly in the concurrent 2000 Serbian local elections and was defeated at both levels. (This was the last local electoral cycle in Serbia in which members were elected for single-member constituencies. All subsequent cycles have taken place under proportional representation.)

He received the eighty-first position on the Radical Party's list for the 2000 Serbian parliamentary election, held later in the year, in which the entire country was counted as a single constituency. The party won twenty-three seats, and he was not given a mandate. (From 2000 to 2011, Serbian parliamentary mandates were awarded to sponsoring parties or coalitions rather than to individual candidates, and it was common practice for mandates to be assigned out of numerical order. Šarović could have been included in his party's delegation despite his list position, though in fact he was not.) During this period, he served as leader of the Radical Party's municipal board in Stari Grad.

First and second assembly terms (2004–08)
Šarović was given the eighty-fifth position on the Radical Party's list in the 2003 Serbian parliamentary election, in which the party won eighty-two seats. He was not initially included in the party's assembly delegation but received a mandate on 12 February 2004 as the replacement for another member who had resigned. Despite winning more seats than any other party in the 2003 election, the Radicals fell well short of a majority and served in opposition. During his first term, Šarović was a member of the legislative committee and the committee on justice and administration.

He led the Radical Party's list in Stari Grad for the 2004 Serbian local elections and was elected when the list won nine out of fifty-six seats. The Democratic Party (Demokratska stranka, DS) won the election, and the Radicals served in opposition at this level as well.

It was reported in 2005 that Šarović had claimed 1.639.088 dinars for travel expenses between Belgrade and Vranje, where he worked as an organizer on behalf of the SRS. In a 2006 interview with the Mexican newspaper Reforma, he said that the Radical Party was not against Serbia joining the European Union, but that it was not willing to take this step at the price of giving up its sovereignty over Kosovo. In the same interview, he said that he had been arrested three times since the fall of Slobodan Milošević's government in 2000.

Šarović received the twenty-first position on the Radical Party's list in the 2007 parliamentary election and was again selected for the party's assembly delegation when the list won eighty-one seats. The Radicals again won more seats than any other party, fell short of a majority, and served in opposition. Šarović was a member of the assembly committee on foreign affairs, the committee on economic reforms, and the administrative committee.

Third assembly term (2009–12)
Šarović was given the tenth position on the Radical Party's list for the 2008 parliamentary election. The party won seventy-eight seats. He also appeared on the SRS lists for Belgrade and Stari Grad in the concurrent local elections. The election results were inconclusive at both the republic and city levels, and negotiations subsequently took place between the Radical Party, the Democratic Party of Serbia (Demokratska stranka Srbije, DSS), and the Socialist Party of Serbia (Socijalistička partija Srbije, SPS) toward forming new coalition governments at both levels. Šarović was not at first selected for another term in the national assembly but instead focused on coalition talks for the new city government in Belgrade. It was rumoured that he would have become city manager had the negotiations been successful. Ultimately, however, they were not: the Socialists chose instead to form coalitions at both levels with the For a European Serbia (Za evropsku Srbiju, ZES) alliance led by the DS. The Radicals remained in opposition. Šarović did not initially take an assembly mandate at any level of government.

In July 2008, Šarović led a protest march in Belgrade's Vozdovac municipality against the arrest of former Bosnian Serb political leader Radovan Karadžić.

The Radical Party experienced a serious split in late 2008, with several members joining the more moderate Serbian Progressive Party (Srpska napredna stranka, SNS) under the leadership of Tomislav Nikolić and Aleksandar Vučić. Šarović remained with the Radicals and was a vocal critic of the new party. He was given a mandate in the Belgrade city assembly on 16 September 2008 and replaced Vučić as the party's leader in that body. He also ran to become Vučić's successor as the Radical Party's secretary-general but was defeated by Elena Božić Talijan.

He later returned to the National Assembly on 28 December 2009, following Božić Talijan's resignation from the body. In his third term, he served on the assembly committee for Kosovo and Metohija and was part of Serbia's delegation to the assembly of the Inter-Parliamentary Union.

Following the arrest of former Bosnian Serb military leader Ratko Mladić in 2011, Šarović described the victims of the Srebrenica massacre as "casualties of war" and that said he believed in Mladić's innocence against charges of war crimes. He was quoted as saying, "Those who died in Srebrenica were only those who did not lower their weapons and continued to fight. War is war and these things happen." During this period, Šarović also served as an adviser to Radical Party leader Vojislav Šešelj, who was then himself facing war crimes charges at the International Criminal Tribunal for the former Yugoslavia (ICTY) in The Hague, Netherlands. On one occasion, the tribunal forbade Šešelj from meeting with Šarović, on the grounds that Šešelj was using such meetings to illicitly send out political directives.

Šarović married Aleksandra Ilić of the New Serbia party in 2011. They divorced in 2013, in part due to political differences.

Out of parliament (2012–16)
Serbia's electoral system was reformed in 2011, such that mandates were awarded in numerical order to candidates on successful lists. Šarović received the fourth position on the Radical Party's list in the 2012 parliamentary election and was promoted to the second position in the 2014 election. He also led the SRS's lists for the Belgrade city assembly and the Stari Grad municipal assembly in the 2012 Serbian local elections and appeared second on the party's list in the 2014 Belgrade City Assembly election. In all of these elections, the Radical Party fell below the electoral threshold for assembly representation.

In 2013, Šarović led protests against negotiations between the governments of Serbia and Kosovo that ultimately led to the Brussels Agreement, which normalized relations between Belgrade and Priština without addressing the status of Kosovo. In one protest, he accused Serbian president Tomislav Nikolić of treason. After the conclusion of the agreement, deputy prime minister Aleksandar Vučić remarked that Šarović had sent him several threatening messages from his personal phone.

SRS leader Vojislav Šešelj was allowed to return to Serbia for health reasons in 2014 while his trial was still in progress. Šarović subsequently indicated that Šešelj would not return to The Hague voluntarily.

Fourth assembly term (2016–20)
The Radicals returned to parliament in the 2016 election, winning twenty-two mandates. Šarović, who once again received the second position on the party's list (after Šešelj), was elected to a fourth term. After the election, Šarović and Nataša Jovanović represented the Radical Party in pro forma discussions with president Tomislav Nikolić on the formation of a new government. The results of these talks were a foregone conclusion, as the Progressives and their allies commanded a majority of seats in parliament. The Radical delegation used their consultation session to demand that Nikolić resign, and the meeting was reported to have ended after thirty seconds. Later in 2016, Šarović was convicted of burning a flag of the United States of America and issued a suspended sentence.

In 2018, Šešelj was convicted in absentia of inciting war crimes with nationalist speeches in 1992. He was issued a ten-year sentence but was not required to serve any time in prison as he had already spent more than ten years in custody at The Hague. Some parliamentarians called for Šešelj to be expelled from the assembly as a result of his conviction; Šarović argued that there were no grounds for this.

During the 2016–20 parliament, Šarović was a member of the assembly's health and family committee and its committee on administrative, budgetary, mandate, and immunity issues; a deputy member of the committee on constitutional and legislative issues, the committee on the diaspora and Serbs in the region, and the committee on Kosovo and Metohija; a deputy member of Serbia's delegation to the NATO Parliamentary Assembly (where Serbia has observer status); and a member of the parliamentary friendship groups with China, Greece, Russia, and Venezuela.

Šarović received the seventh position on the SRS's list in the 2020 Serbian parliamentary election, in which the Radicals once again fell below the electoral threshold. He resigned from the party on 16 July 2020, citing fundamental disagreements with Šešelj on both the party's direction and the political situation in Serbia. He later accused Šešelj of being insufficiently critical of Serbia's Progressive-led administration and rejected suggestions that he himself would join the SNS.

Leader of Love, Faith, Hope (2020–)
In September 2020, Šarović launched the Love, Faith, Hope political movement. He said that the name was chosen to reflect what he described as "universal Christian virtues, which we need as a society, people and state, and from which we as a society have moved away," adding that the movement wanted "a state where the law applies to everyone." He said that he considered Aleksandar Vučić as his movement's primary political enemy.

Šarović argued in September 2021 that the Taliban's return to power in Afghanistan following the withdrawal of American forces showed that it was "disastrous" for countries to become aligned with the United States of America. In comparison, he credited Russia with sustaining Bashar al-Assad's government and thereby defeating Islamic State in Syria.

Šarović appeared in the lead position on the electoral list of Love, Faith, Hope in the 2022 Belgrade City Assembly election. The list did not cross the electoral threshold.

In May 2022, Vojislav Šešelj received a summons to appear before the International Residual Mechanism for Criminal Tribunals (the successor body to the ICTY) to respond to charges concerning the publication of classified information and the names of protected witnesses. The summons also included the names of seven current and former Radical Party officials, including Šarović. Šarović said that he recognized only the laws of Serbia and would not respond to the summons.

Electoral record

Local (City of Belgrade)

Local (Municipality of Stari Grad)

References

1974 births
Living people
Politicians from Belgrade
Members of the National Assembly (Serbia)
Members of the City Assembly of Belgrade
Delegates to the Inter-Parliamentary Union Assembly
Deputy Members of the NATO Parliamentary Assembly
Serbian Radical Party politicians